Chromium(III) perchlorate is an inorganic compound with the chemical formula Cr(ClO4)3. It's hexahydrate Cr(ClO4)3·6H2O is a cyan solid that dissolves in water.

Preparation
Chromium perchlorate can prepared by reacting chromium(III) oxide or chromium(III) hydroxide with perchloric acid:
Cr2O3 + 6HClO4 → 2Cr(ClO4)3 + 3H2O

Hydrates
Chromium perchlorate has many hydrates, such as the hexahydrate Cr(ClO4)3·6H2O and a nonahydrate Cr(ClO4)3·9H2O. All of them are cyan substances that are soluble in water.

Related compounds
Cr(ClO4)3 will react with NH3 in suitable conditions to form an orange hexammine complex Cr(ClO4)3·6NH3. Other compounds with the general formula Cr(ClO4)3(NH3)x are also known. When x = 3, this compound is red, when x = 4 or 5, it is orange. The hexammine complex will explode.
Cr(ClO4)3 can also form complexes with N2H4, such as purple Cr(ClO4)3·2N2H4.
Cr(ClO4)3 can also form complexes with urea (CO(NH2)2), such as Cr(ClO4)3·6CO(NH2)2 with a hexagonic structure.

References

Chromium(III) compounds
Perchlorates